The Parbo Bier Cup is a bi-annual International football(soccer) tournament, which is organized by the Stichting Internationaal Voetbal Suriname (SIVS) of which former Surinamese-Dutch International Stanley Menzo is the chairman. The beer brewery Parbo is the sponsor of the tournament after which it was named.

History

Parbo Bier Cup 2003
The 2003 Parbo Bier Cup marked the first edition of the tournament contested from the 15th to 19 January. The participants included Dutch Eredivisie side NAC Breda and Surinamese Hoofdklasse clubs S.V. Robinhood, S.V. Transvaal and S.V. Voorwaarts. NAC Breda won the first Parbo Bier Cup, winning all their matches, defeating Transvaal (5–0) in their final match. Transvall finished the tournament as runner-up, leaving Voorwaarts in third, and Robinhood in fourth place.

Parbo Bier Cup 2004
The 2004 edition of the Parbo Bier Cup was contested by the national teams of the Netherlands Antilles and Suriname, plus two SVB Hoofdklasse clubs, S.V. Transvaal and S.V. Leo Victor. The Netherlands Antilles won the cup with seven points, defeating Transvaal (2–1), Leo Victor (3–2), and drawing with Suriname (1–1), clinching the second edition of the tournament.

Parbo Bier Cup 2005
The Parbo Bier Cup 2005 was the third edition of the tournament. Participating teams were Dutch Eredivisie club RKC Waalwijk, and Surinamese Hoofdklasse clubs S.V. Transvaal, FCS Nacional and SBCS. RKC Waalwijk won all their matches thus winning the cup, followed by Transvaal, Nacional and SBCS, each having won one match, deciding the final placement on goal difference.

Parbo Bier Cup 2007
The Parbo Bier Cup of 2007 was the fourth edition of the tournament. The participating teams were the under-23 teams of French Guiana-U23, Guyana-U23, Suriname-U23 and the Suriprofs, an unofficial team made up of Surinamese expatriates living in Europe. The Suriname under-23 team won the tournament with seven points, defeating Guyana (2–1), drawing with French Guiana (0–0) and defeating the Suriprofs (1–0).

Parbo Bier Cup 2009
The Parbo Bier Cup of 2009 was the fifth edition of the tournament and was held on the 3rd, 5th and 7 June. The four participating teams were the national teams of Antigua and Barbuda, Guyana, French Guiana and Suriname which was represented by a selection of players of the Suriname national team and the Suriprofs.

Matches

Final table

Suriname (Natio/Suriprofs) selection

Parbo Bier Cup 2011
In 2011 the Parbo Bier Cup was cancelled, due to the fact that the main sponsors of the Surinamese Football Association (SVB) at the André Kamperveen Stadion had left no room for the main sponsors of the tournament at the stadium.

Parbo Bier Cup 2012
The participants for the 2012 edition of the Parbo Bier Cup were the Suriprofs/Natio, the national team of Guyana and Dutch Eredivisie club SBV Vitesse. Vitesse finished the tournament as winners of the cup, while Vitesse player Jonathan Reis was awarded the golden boot award as the most valuable player of the tournament.

Vitesse selection: Patrick van Aanholt, Just Berends, Alexander Büttner, Brahim Darri, Jan-Arie van der Heijden, Nicky Hofs, Julian Jenner, Mart Lieder, Alex Santos da Vitória, Anderson Santos da Vitória, Sander van de Streek, Frank van der Struijk, Jonathan Reis, Eloy Room, Piet Velthuizen, Wimilio Vink, Michihiro Yasuda.

Matches

Participation

By country

Titles and awards

Number of titles

See also 
 Parbo Bier

References

Sport in Paramaribo
Surinamese football friendly trophies
Recurring sporting events established in 2003
2003 establishments in Suriname